John William Fike (June 11, 1887 – January 10, 1961) was an American football and basketball coach. He served as the head football coach at the University of Denver from 1915 to 1918, compiling a record of 20–7–1. Fike was also the head basketball coach at Denver from 1916 to 1918, tallying a mark of 7–8.  Fike died on January 10, 1961.

Head coaching record

College football

References

External links
 

1887 births
1961 deaths
Denver Pioneers baseball players
Denver Pioneers football coaches
Denver Pioneers football players
Denver Pioneers men's basketball coaches
High school football coaches in Colorado
People from Yuma County, Colorado
Coaches of American football from Colorado
Players of American football from Colorado
Baseball players from Colorado
Basketball coaches from Colorado